Patrakeyevskaya is a rural locality (a village) in Verkhovskoye Rural Settlement, Tarnogsky District, Vologda Oblast, Russia. The population was 35 as of 2002.

Geography 
Patrakeyevskaya is located 44 km west of Tarnogsky Gorodok (the district's administrative centre) by road. Burtsevskaya is the nearest rural locality.

References 

Rural localities in Tarnogsky District